The W.E. Barnard House, at 950 Joaquin Miller Dr. in Reno, Nevada, United States, was built in 1930.  It includes Tudor Revival architecture, and, within that, is best described as a Cotswold Cottage style small house.  Its two most dominant architectural features are a beehive chimney and a "high-pitched, gabled entry with a characteristic Tudor arch".

It was listed on the National Register of Historic Places in 2002; the listing included two contributing buildings.  It was deemed significant "for its role in Reno's community planning and development history", having to do with its association with developer William Everett Barnard, and also "as an excellent local example of the Tudor/English Country Cottage style of architecture, within the broader category of Period Revival."

References 

Houses in Reno, Nevada
Cotswold architecture
Houses completed in 1930
Houses on the National Register of Historic Places in Nevada
National Register of Historic Places in Reno, Nevada
Tudor Revival architecture in Nevada